Il malato immaginario (internationally released as Hypochondriac) is a 1979 Italian comedy film directed by Tonino Cervi.  It is a loose adaptation of Molière's Le Malade imaginaire set in 1600 papal Rome.

Plot 
In Rome the rich and stingy landowner Argante believed to be sick in any possible harm, although born as a fish. Another thing that the cruel man holds great attention is his money and his contract with a young doctor for the wedding of his daughter Lucrezia. In fact, the good catch is considered the girl a total moron who knows nothing about medicine, but Don Argante not pay much attention and just think to combine the deal as soon as possible. Meanwhile his wife, without his or her knowledge, betrays him with another. Comes the doctor betrothed his daughter to the house of Argante, as he finds himself in yet another false relapse, and thus begins to visit him. Argante now realizes the nonsense that says the young but is only about money and does not care. Later, between the master and his servant turns a strong argument that Argante is not loved by anyone in the family except by his servants. To test the family Argante is persuaded by the servants to pretend to be dead in order to discover the hatred that his wife and family have of him and so it happens. As if that were not enough rich to the poor has been stolen also deposit money.

Cast 
Alberto Sordi: Don Argante
Laura Antonelli: Tonietta
Bernard Blier: Il dottor Purgone
Giuliana De Sio: Angelica
Marina Vlady: Lucrezia, seconda moglie
Christian De Sica: Claudio Anzalone
Ettore Manni: L'amministratore dei poderi
Vittorio Caprioli: Vincenzo, il vecchio servo
Stefano Satta Flores: Orlando Mascarelli, Il notaio
Carlo Bagno: Il dottor Anzalone
Eros Pagni: Il dottore

References

External links

1979 films
Films based on works by Molière
Italian films based on plays
Films directed by Tonino Cervi
Commedia all'italiana
Films set in the 17th century
1970s historical comedy films
Italian historical comedy films
1979 comedy films
1970s Italian films